Shakil Khan, known professionally as Shakil Khan, is a Bangladeshi actor who was active from 1997 to 2010.

Politics
When Talukder Abdul Khaleque, Member of Parliament for Bagerhat-3, resigned from parliament in April 2018 to run for mayor of Khulna, Khan considered contesting the resulting by-election as an independent candidate. He decided against a run, however, and Habibun Nahar, Khaleque's wife, was elected unopposed.

Khan sought the Awami League nomination for the seat in the December 2018 general election, but the party gave the nod to the incumbent.

Film career
Khan went on to perform in films Paharadar, Biyer Phul, Narir Mon, Koshto, and Abujh Bou, among others.

Khan wed actress Jona, his co-star in the 2002 film Hridoyer Bashi, but the marriage did not last long.

Filmography

See also
 Cinema of Bangladesh

References

Living people
Bangladeshi male film actors
People from Bagerhat District
Year of birth missing (living people)
Place of birth missing (living people)